Torkar is a surname. Notable people with the surname include:

 Igor Torkar (1913–2004), pen name of Boris Fakin, Slovenian writer, playwright, and poet
 Isidor Torkar (born 1960), Swedish actor

See also
 Torkan (surname)